Romantic Times was an American genre magazine specializing in romance novels. It was founded as a newsletter in 1981 by Kathryn Falk. The initial publication took nine months to create and was distributed to 3,000 subscribers. In 2004, the magazine reportedly had 150,000 subscribers, and had built a reputation as "Romance's premiere genre magazine".

From 1982 to 2018, the magazine organized the "Romantic Times Booklover's Convention." Several thousand people attended the annual convention, which featured author signings, a costume ball, and a male beauty pageant.

In May 2018, Kathryn Falk and her co-owner, husband Kenneth Rubin announced the closure of the magazine.
The last RT Booklovers Convention ended with the one held May 15–20, 2018 in Reno NV. 
Falk stated "After 38 years, I am retiring and ending my participation in publishing...".

References

1981 establishments in the United States
2018 disestablishments in New York (state)
Book review magazines
Defunct literary magazines published in the United States
Magazines established in 1981
Magazines disestablished in 2018
Magazines published in New York City
Romantic fiction